At the 2006 FIFA World Cup, Brazil participated for the 18th time in the event. The country remained as the only national team to have participated in every installment of the FIFA World Cup.

The Brazilian team played until the quarter-finals, where they were defeated by France, finishing the tournament in the fifth place — for the fourth time in history (1954, 1982, and 1986 were the previous instances).

Qualifying
This was the first time in history in which a returning champion (the country had won the 2002 World Cup) had to play for a berth in the next World Cup — that had a direct effect in the organization of the 2006 World Cup: since the 1990 World Cup, the competition has had an opening match, which is played immediately after the Opening Ceremonies; until the last World Cup, this match was a privilege of the winner of the previous World Cup, who would play its first match as the first match of the given World Cup, against an opponent from its group, as decided by the official draw (in the 1990 World Cup, Argentina, winner of the 1986 FIFA World Cup, played Cameroon in the opening match; in 1994, Germany, winner of the 1990 World Cup, played Bolivia; in 1998, Brazil played Scotland and in 2002 France played Senegal). As of the 2006 World Cup, because of the change in the rules, with the last champion no longer having a secured berth in the competition, the opening match has become another privilege of the host nation (in the 2006 World Cup, Germany, as the host nation, played Costa Rica in the opening match).  Despite being the returning champion, the Brazilian team debuted, against Croatia, only four days after the Opening Ceremonies and the opening match.

The national team qualified with more ease than in previous years — for the 1994 World Cup, Brazil only qualified in the very last match, against Uruguay, where a defeat would have meant missing the finals; For the 2002 FIFA World Cup, Brazil had four different managers, and was once in serious jeopardy of being left out of the event.

The Qualifying for the 2006 World Cup repeated the format installed for the previous Qualifying tournament, in 2000 and 2001 (for the 2002 World Cup): all ten South American countries played each other, in two-leg matches, with the top four teams qualifying automatically for the World Cup, whereas the fifth best team would play the champion of Oceania, which was Australia, for a berth in the World Cup.

Brazil finished first, winning the Qualifying tournament.  The results were the following:

The final standings were the following:

World Cup preparation

A month before the start of the competition, the Brazil national team took quarters in the small Swiss town of Weggis, at the Weggis Park Hotel. The objective was to get the team accustomed to Germany's climate while maintaining the focus on the competition. The preparation started on May 22 and ended on June 4.

During this time, the Brazilian team played two friendly matches.  The first was on May 28, against the under-20 team of the Brazilian club Fluminense, which was in Europe to play a tournament and took a detour to Switzerland to meet and play the national team; this match ended 13–1 in favour of the national team.  The second match was played against the state team of the Swiss Lucerne. The match took place in Basel, at the St. Jakob Stadion and was won by the Brazilian team with a score of 8 goals to nul.

For this period in Switzerland, the Brazilian Football Confederation sold the rights to explore the presence of the national team to a Swiss events enterprise. In exchange for the declared amount of US$1.2 million, the Swiss company was allowed to sell tickets for the practice sessions — which were sold at €40 each, for about 5,000 people per session —, negotiate permissions for vending points to operate within the training facility and surrounding area — which were sold for about €2,000 plus 10% of the profit — and to organize and explore the friendly matches that the national team was to play during its preparation in Switzerland.

On May 31, only 13 days away from the team's debut in the World Cup, defender Edmílson was cut from the squad due to a knee injury he had sustained during the practice session the day prior. São Paulo's Mineiro was called to take his place.

Upon leaving Weggis, on June 4 the national team made a stop in Geneva on June 5 to play its last friendly match before arriving in Germany. There, the team played New Zealand at the Stade de Genève – refereed by Jerome Laperriere – defeating New Zealand 4–0.

Finally, the team travelled to the German town of Königstein im Taunus, which invested the declared amount of €500,000 in order to prepare for receiving the Brazilian team.

Draw
Traditionally, the host nation (in this case, Germany) is the first seed, being placed in Group A. On December 6, 2005, so as to prevent a possible match between Brazil and Germany before the final, FIFA placed the previous competition champion as the sixth seed, in Group F. The opponents of the Brazilian team in the first stage were, respectively, Croatia, Australia and Japan.

History
Round Robin

The Brazilian team had never faced any of its first round opponents before in World Cups.  But other matches, both official and friendly ones, have taken place.  The history of those matches until, but not including, the 2006 World Cup is as follows:

source

Round of 16

Prior to their meeting in the Round of 16 of the 2006 FIFA World Cup, Brazil and Ghana had played only one friendly match.  Although this was officially a match between the two main teams, Brazil played it using its under-23 team (the so-called "Olympic squad"), as the match was a part of the preparation for the football competition of the 1996 Summer Olympic Games.

source

Quarterfinal

Both the first and the last matches between Brazil and France prior to their 2006 World Cup quarterfinal encounter were friendly matches.  The last one was a commemorative display for FIFA's centennial anniversary.

Sources:

World Cup squad

Pld = matches played, YC = yellow cards, RC = red cards.

1 Mineiro replaced Edmílson, who was cut due to a knee injury.

Matches
All times local (UTC+2)

Round robin

Group F

First Round

Brazil vs Croatia

Tuesday, June 13, 2006
21:00 - Olympiastadion, Berlin - Attendance: 72,000

Referee: Benito Archundia (Mexico)
Assistant referees:
José Ramírez (Mexico)
Héctor Vergara (Canada)
Fourth official: Mohamed Guezzaz (Morocco)
Fifth official:  Brahim Djezzar (Algeria)
Man of the match:  Kaká

Second Round

Brazil vs. Australia

Sunday, June 18, 2006
18:00 - FIFA World Cup Stadium Munich, Munich - Attendance: 66,000

 Referee: Markus Merk (Germany)
 Assistant referees:
 Christian Schräer (Germany)
 Jan-Hendrik Salver (Germany)
 Fourth official: Marco Rodríguez (Mexico)
 Fifth official: Leonel Leal (Costa Rica)
 Man of the match:  Zé Roberto

Third Round

Brazil vs Japan

Thursday, June 22, 2006
21:00 - FIFA World Cup Stadium Dortmund, Dortmund - Attendance: 65,000

 Referee: Éric Poulat (France)
 Assistant referees:
 Lionel Dagorne (France)
 Vincent Texier (France)
 Fourth official: Jerome Damon (South Africa)
 Fifth official: Enock Molefe (South Africa)
Man of the match:  Ronaldo

Knockout stage

Round of 16 – Brazil vs Ghana

Tuesday, June 27, 2006
17:00 - FIFA WM-Stadion Dortmund, Dortmund - Attendance: 65,000

 Referee: Ľuboš Micheľ (Slovakia)
 Assistant referees
 Roman Slysko (Slovakia)
 Martin Balko (Slovakia)
 Fourth official: Mark Shield (Australia)
 Fifth official:  Nathan Gibson (Australia)
 Man of the match:  Zé Roberto

Quarterfinal – Brazil vs France

Saturday, July 1, 2006
21:00 - FIFA WM-Stadion Frankfurt, Frankfurt - Attendance: 52,000

Referee: Luis Medina Cantalejo (Spain)
Assistant referees
Victoriano Giráldez Carrasco (Spain)
Pedro Medina Hernández (Spain)
Fourth official: Mark Shield (Australia)
Fifth official: Ben Wilson (Australia)
Man of the match:  Zinedine Zidane

Brazilians in other national teams
The Brazilian participation in the World Cup was not restricted to the national football team.  Many individuals were involved with other national teams, some as players, some as members of their teams' technical staff.  Those playing for other national teams had acquired the respective country's citizenship, and according to FIFA's ruling, can never play for the Brazilian team in the future.  Those were:

 In Saudi Arabia: Coach Marcos Paquetá and the entire technical staff, hired by Paquetá.  Immediately before the last match in the first stage of the World Cup, when disqualification was imminent for Saudi Arabia, Saudi prince Nawaf bin Faisal, who is president of the Saudi Football Confederation, guaranteed that, regardless of the outcome, Paquetá was to remain as Saudi Arabia's head coach.
 In Tunisia: Maranhão-born Francileudo dos Santos was a striker for the Tunisian team.  He was regarded as the team's "star".
 In Portugal: Head coach Luiz Felipe Scolari and his assistant coach, Flávio Murtosa; as well as midfielder Deco.
 In Japan: former player and Brazilian football legend Zico was Japan's head coach.  Following the team's elimination, Zico left the Japanese team. In addition, Japan also had the Maringá-born fullback Alex Santos.
 In Spain: São Paulo-born midfielder Marcos Senna played for the Spanish team.
 In Costa Rica: Alexandre Guimarães was the country's head coach for the World Cup, as he had been in Costa Rica's previous participation, in 2002.  He also played for Costa Rica in 1990.  After losing all three matches, Guimarães left the national team, allegedly in the wake of death threats received via anonymous phone calls.

References 

 
Countries at the 2006 FIFA World Cup